The Minnesota SpokesmanRecorder is an African-American, English-language newspaper headquartered in Minneapolis, Minnesota and serves readers in the Twin Cities. Founded in 1934 by Cecil Earle Newman (who remained editor until his death in 1976), it is the oldest continuously operated black newspaper and longest-lived black-owned business in Minnesota. The current CEO of the paper is Newman's granddaughter, Tracey Williams-Dillard. The current editor is Mel Reeves.

History
The newspaper's first issue appeared on August 10, 1934 as the St. Paul Reporter. Until 2000, it released weekly alongside The Minnesota Spokesman-Recorder, also published and edited by Newman (until his death in 1976). The newspaper office moved from St. Paul to 3744 Fourth Avenue South, Minneapolis, in 1958. Under Newman's leadership, the newspaper played a key role in the civil rights movement in Minnesota.

After Newman's death in 1976, his wife Laura took over operation of the papers. In 2000, she merged them into a single title, the Minnesota Spokesman-Recorder. In 2007, Newman's granddaughter Tracey Williams-Dillard became CEO of the paper.

The late photographer, filmmaker, writer, and composer Gordon Parks was a photo-journalist for the newspaper.
 
The newspaper building on Fourth Avenue was declared a historic landmark in 2015 for its association with the civil rights movement in Minnesota.
 
The Minnesota SpokesmanRecorder is a member of the National Newspaper Association, Amalgamated Publishers, Inc., Metropolitan Economic Development Association, Minnesota Minority Media Coalition, and Minnesota Newspaper Association.

In 2021, the newspaper's archives from 1934 to 1964 were publicly digitized in collaboration with the National Endowment for the Humanities and the Minnesota Historical Society.

See also 
 38th Street South
 History of Minneapolis
 Launa Q. Newman

References

Further reading

External links 
 Official website
 1934-1964 archives of the Minneapolis Spokesman, at the Minnesota Digital Newspaper Hub

Newspapers published in Minnesota
Mass media in Minneapolis–Saint Paul
Publications established in 1934
1934 establishments in Minnesota
Newspapers published in Minneapolis–Saint Paul, Minnesota
African-American newspapers